Michael Blackburn is the name of: 

Michael Blackburn (sailor) (born 1970), Australian Olympic medallist and sailor
Michael Blackburn (poet) (born 1954), British poet

See also
Blackburn (surname)